Robert William Barker (born December 12, 1923) is an American retired television game show host. He is known for hosting CBS's The Price Is Right from 1972 to 2007, making it the longest-running daytime game show in North American television history. He is also known for hosting Truth or Consequences from 1956 to 1975.

Born in Darrington, Washington, in modest circumstances, Barker enlisted in the United States Navy during World War II. He worked part-time in radio while attending college. In 1950, he moved to California to pursue a broadcasting career. He was given his own radio show, The Bob Barker Show, which ran for six years. He began his game show career in 1956, hosting Truth or Consequences. He subsequently hosted various game shows, and the Miss Universe and Miss USA pageants from 1967 to 1987, giving him the distinction of being the longest-serving host of those pageants. He began hosting The Price Is Right in 1972. When his wife Dorothy Jo died of lung cancer at age 57 in 1981, he became an advocate for animal rights and of animal rights activism, supporting groups such as the United Activists for Animal Rights and the Sea Shepherd Conservation Society. In 2007, he retired from hosting The Price Is Right after celebrating his 50-year career on television. In the years after his retirement, Barker continued to make occasional public appearances from 2009 to 2017.

Early life

Barker spent most of his youth on the Rosebud Indian Reservation in Mission, South Dakota. The U.S. Indian Census Rolls, 1885–1940, list Barker as an enrolled member of the Sioux tribe. His mother, Matilda ("Tillie") Valandra ( Matilda Kent Tarleton), was a school teacher; his father, Byron John Barker, was the foreman on the electrical high line through the state of Washington. As Barker's father was one-quarter Sioux, and his mother non-Native, Barker is one-eighth Sioux. Barker attended the grade school on the Rosebud Reservation where his mother was a teacher. He once said, "I've always bragged about being part Indian, because they are a people to be proud of. And the Sioux were the greatest warriors of them all."

Barker met his future wife, Dorothy Jo Gideon, at an Ella Fitzgerald concert while he was attending high school in Missouri; they began dating when he was 15. He attended Drury College (now Drury University) in Springfield, Missouri, on a basketball athletic scholarship. He was a member of the Epsilon Beta chapter of Sigma Nu fraternity at Drury. He joined the United States Navy Reserve in 1943 during World War II to train as a fighter pilot, but did not serve on active duty. During leave from the military, he married Dorothy Jo on January 12, 1945. After the war, he returned to Drury to finish his education, graduating summa cum laude with a degree in economics.

Career

Broadcasting career
While attending college in Drury, Barker worked his first media job at KTTS-FM Radio in Springfield. He and his wife left Springfield and moved to Lake Worth Beach, Florida, and he was news editor and announcer at nearby WWPG 1340 AM in Palm Beach (now WPBR in Lantana). In 1950, he moved to California to advance his broadcasting career. He was given his own radio show, The Bob Barker Show, which ran for the next six years from Burbank. He was hosting an audience-participation radio show on KNX (AM) in Los Angeles when game show producer Ralph Edwards, who was looking for a new host to replace Jack Bailey on the daytime-television version of his long-running show, Truth or Consequences, happened to be listening and liked Barker's voice and style.

Game show career

Truth or Consequences (1956–1975)

Barker started hosting Truth or Consequences on December 31, 1956, and continued with the program until 1975.

The Price Is Right (1972–2007)

In early 1972, Mark Goodson and Bill Todman began shopping a modernized revival of The Price Is Right to stations, with Dennis James as host. CBS expressed interest in the series, on one condition: instead of James, Barker would be installed as host. After some initial resistance, Barker instead offered to host another upcoming CBS game show, Jack Barry's The Joker's Wild (which had difficulty finding a host and was scheduled to debut the same day as Price) to allow James to host Price, but CBS rejected this proposal.

On September 4, 1972, Barker began hosting the CBS revival of The Price Is Right.

On October 15, 1987, Barker did what other MCs almost never did then: renounced hair dye and began wearing his hair gray, which was its natural color by that time.

On October 31, 2006, Barker made his announcement that he would retire from The Price Is Right in June 2007. He taped his final episode on June 6, 2007, with the show airing twice on June 15.

After his retirement, Barker made three return appearances to The Price is Right. He first appeared on the episode that aired on April 16, 2009, to promote his new autobiography, Priceless Memories. He appeared in the Showcase round at the end of the show. Barker made another guest appearance on the show to celebrate his 90th birthday, which aired on December 12, 2013. He announced a contestant for the first time ever on the show, along with one showcase. Barker's latest appearance was a surprise appearance on April 1, 2015, for an April Fools' Day switch where he took Drew Carey's place at the show's intro. He hosted the first one bid and pricing game of that day before handing the hosting duties back to Carey and later appeared during the showcase.

Personal life

Health
On September 16, 1999, Barker was in Washington, D.C. to testify before Congress regarding proposed legislation that would ban captive elephants from traveling shows, such as circuses. While preparing for the presentation, Barker experienced what he called clumsiness in his right hand. He was admitted to George Washington University Hospital and diagnosed with a partially blocked left carotid artery. Barker underwent carotid endarterectomy to remove the blockage. The procedure went well enough that he was able to return to work within the month.

Three years later, Barker had two additional health crises after taping the 30th-season finale of The Price is Right. While lying in the sun on May 30, 2002, he experienced a stroke and was hospitalized; six weeks later, on July 11, Barker underwent prostate surgery. Both hospitalizations occurred at George Washington University Hospital in Washington, D.C. Both surgeries were successful.

Barker had several mild bouts with skin cancer, a result of his frequent tanning. He consulted a dermatologist regularly to make sure any cancers were caught and removed before they spread; they did not pose a threat to his life. During a televised interview, Barker told viewers, "I urge anyone who has spent some time in the sun, whether you're doing it now or not, go to a dermatologist once a year."

On October 20, 2015, two police officers passing Barker's Los Angeles-area home saw him trip and fall on a sidewalk. They called an ambulance that took him to Cedars-Sinai Medical Center, where he received stitches for an injured forehead and was released; he also hurt his left knee.

Barker slipped and hit his head at home on June 19, 2017. His maid drove him to the emergency room, where he was checked and released. His representative said it was not as serious as his earlier fall.

In October and November 2018, Barker was rushed to the hospital for severe back pain.

Lawsuits
In 1994, former model Dian Parkinson filed a lawsuit against Barker alleging sexual harassment following a three-year affair while working on The Price Is Right. Parkinson, who alleged that she was extorted by threats of firing, later dropped her lawsuit, claiming the stress from the ordeal was damaging her health.

In 1995, model Holly Hallstrom left The Price Is Right and later filed suit against Barker, alleging that the reason she was fired was not so much because of her 14lb medication-mediated weight gain (as documented) but because, to Barker's displeasure, she refused to give false information to the media regarding Parkinson's suit, as she alleges Barker had requested she do. Barker countersued for slander, but Hallstrom prevailed, receiving a settlement in 2005.

In October 2007, Deborah Curling, a CBS employee assigned to The Price Is Right, filed a lawsuit against CBS, Bob Barker and The Price Is Right producers, claiming that she was forced to quit her job after testifying against Barker in a wrongful-termination lawsuit brought by a previous show producer. Curling claimed that she was demoted to an "intolerable work environment" backstage, which caused her to leave the job. Curling, who is black, also alleged that the show's producers, including Barker, created a hostile work environment in which black employees and contestants were discriminated against. A few months later, Barker was removed from the lawsuit, and in September 2009, the lawsuit was dismissed. Curling's attorney stated that he planned to appeal the dismissal of the lawsuit. In January 2012, the California Court of Appeals affirmed the dismissal.

Animal rights
Barker has been a vegetarian for over three decades. He has also been an outspoken advocate for a variety of animal rights issues:

In 1982, Barker began ending The Price Is Right episodes with the phrase: "This is Bob Barker reminding you to help control the pet population — have your pets spayed or neutered."

In 1987, Barker requested the removal of fur prizes for the Miss USA pageant and stepped down as host when the producers refused.

In 1994, Barker founded DJ&T Foundation, named after his late wife and mother, which has contributed millions of dollars to animal-neutering programs and funded animal rescue and park facilities all over the United States.

In 2004, Barker donated $1 million (equivalent to $ million in ) to Columbia Law School to support the study of animal rights.

In 2009, Barker wrote a letter  their bear exhibits.

In 2009, Barker threatened to not attend the 2009 Game Show Awards, where he was to receive a lifetime achievement award, because Betty White would be attending. Although he had previously worked with White, he was feuding with her over the treatment of an elephant at the Los Angeles Zoo. White instead did not attend and pre-recorded her comments that she was scheduled to make about another awardee, Mark Goodson. Also that year, Barker donated $1 million (equivalent to $1.4 million in 2021) to University of Virginia's Law School to support the study of animal rights. He made similar donations to Harvard Law School, Georgetown University Law Center, Duke University School of Law, Northwestern University Pritzker School of Law, Stanford Law School and the University of California at Los Angeles."

In 2010, Sea Shepherd Conservation Society announced that it had secretly purchased and outfitted a ship to interdict Japanese whaling operations in the Southern Ocean using $5 million (equivalent to $ million in ) provided by Barker. The ship was then named the MY Bob Barker, and its existence was first revealed when it helped discover the location of the whaling in Japan.

Barker has participated in several PETA public service announcements over the years and, in 2010, he donated $2.5 million (equivalent to $ million in ) towards the purchase of office space for the organization in Los Angeles. The "Bob Barker Building" opened in 2012.

Film and other TV appearances
In 1996, Barker played himself in the Adam Sandler comedy Happy Gilmore. In one scene, Barker beats up Gilmore after an altercation arising from their teaming up in a Pro-Am Golf Tournament. In 2007, during a CBS prime-time special commemorating Barker's career, the fight scene from Happy Gilmore was shown, after which Sandler made a surprise appearance on stage to read a poem paying tribute to Barker. In 2015, during Comedy Central's "Night of Too Many Stars" benefit show for autism, Barker and Sandler reunited for a video featuring the two of them in a follow-up fight at the hospital, which ends with both of them dying and going to heaven.
Barker was a semi-regular panelist on the game shows Tattletales (1975–1976, with wife Dorothy Jo) and Match Game (1973–1980). Barker sat in Richard Dawson's former place during the first week of Dawson's permanent absence from Match Game.
Barker co-hosted CBS' coverage of the Rose Parade from Pasadena, California for several years during the 1970s and 1980s.
In the 1970s, he was the host of the annual/biennial Pillsbury Bake-Off (the bake-off occurred every two years starting in 1976). In 1978, he was the first host to have a male category champ.
Barker appeared on Bonanza, playing a character named Mort in the 1960 episode "Denver McKee".
Barker has appeared on various talk shows such as: Dinah!, Larry King Live, The Arsenio Hall Show, Crook & Chase, Donny & Marie, The Rosie O'Donnell Show, The Ellen DeGeneres Show, The Wayne Brady Show, the Late Show with David Letterman, and The Late Late Show with Craig Ferguson.
Barker also made cameo appearances on The Nanny and The Bold and the Beautiful in 2002 and 2014.
About one year after retirement, Barker appeared in a public service announcement promoting the transition to digital television in the United States. The advertisement was produced under the first proposed date of February 16, 2009, for the transition.
On September 7, 2009, Barker was a special guest host for WWE Raw (called "The Price is Raw") in Rosemont, Illinois. Aired during a period when nearly every episode of the weekly wrestling show featured a celebrity guest host, with mixed results, Barker's appearance has been ranked the best of nearly 80 hosts.
Barker agreed to be a rotating guest co-host on The Huckabee Show, a daily TV talk show hosted by Mike Huckabee. Barker first appeared on the show July 29, 2010.
Barker appeared in a commercial for State Farm Insurance's "Magic Jingle" campaign, where he made "a new car!" appear for a woman whose previous car was totaled by a giant concrete cylinder.
Barker filmed a TV advertisement endorsing David Jolly, a candidate for the Republican Party nomination for the 2014 Florida's 13th congressional district special election. Jolly won the nomination and ultimately won the seat.
Barker voiced the character Bob Barnacle, a snail business owner on "Sanctuary!", an episode of the Nickelodeon animated series SpongeBob SquarePants.

Awards and honors
Daytime Emmy Awards
Overall 19-time winner:
14-time winner of Daytime Emmy Award for Outstanding Game Show Host, as host of The Price is Right
4-time winner of Daytime Emmy Award for Outstanding Game Show, as executive producer of The Price is Right
Lifetime Achievement Award, presented at the 1995 Daytime Emmy Awards

WWE
2009 Slammy Award for Best Guest Host.

Media
"Bob Barker Studio" at CBS Television City named in his honor.
Time magazine's Greatest Game Show Host of All-Time
GSN Lifetime Achievement Award

Halls of Fame
Star on the Hollywood Walk of Fame
Television Hall of Fame (class of 2004).
NAB Broadcasting Hall of Fame (class of 2008).

Autobiography
Barker's autobiography,  Priceless Memories, written with former Los Angeles Times book review editor Digby Diehl, was published on April 6, 2009.

See also
 List of animal rights advocates

Notes

References

External links

Bob Barker at Academy of Television Arts & Sciences

1923 births
American animal rights activists
American game show hosts
American male television actors
Beauty pageant hosts
Rosebud Sioux people
California Republicans
Daytime Emmy Award for Outstanding Game Show Host winners
Living people
Military personnel from Washington (state)
Native American male actors
People from Mission, South Dakota
People from Rosebud Indian Reservation, South Dakota
People from Snohomish County, Washington
People from Springfield, Missouri
The Price Is Right
United States Navy officers
United States Navy personnel of World War II
United States Navy reservists
Academy of Magical Arts Special Fellowship winners